Filling Up The City Skies is the second studio album by the American electronic music producer Pretty Lights, released on October 30, 2008 by Pretty Lights Music. It is a double album as well as the first album released after Michal Menert's departure from the project, leaving Derek Vincent Smith as the only one left to continue the project. Because of this, the album cover reads "Derek Vincent Smith of Pretty Lights" since Michal Menert was not present during the production of the album. The album's artwork features the skyline of the Minneapolis, Minnesota superimposed over the skyline of Hong Kong. The original release included an additional track, "Speaking of Happiness", which was later removed for copyright reasons.

Track listing
Filling Up The City Skies

References

Albums free for download by copyright owner
2006 albums
Pretty Lights albums